The Matanuska Formation consists of more than  of sedimentary strata exposed in the northern Chugach Mountains, Matanuska Valley, and southern Talkeetna Mountains of south-central Alaska. The Matanuska Formation contains strata from Early Cretaceous (Albian) to Late Cretaceous (Maestrichtian). Parts of the formation contain abundant marine mollusks, foraminifera, and radiolaria. Fossils of nonmarine plants are found in some beds. Fossils of two dinosaurs have been recovered from marine mudstones in the formation. The lower Matanuska Formation (MF) is several hundred meters thick and includes nonmarine and marine sediments. Campanian-Maastrichtian graded sandstone, conglomerate, and mudstone comprise the upper 2000 m of the Formation.

Invertebrate paleofauna

Annelida
Calcareous worm tube fossils are known from the formation.

Bivalves

Cephalopods

The formation's thin shelled heteromorphic ammonites probably lived at depths of 36–183 m. The formation's ammonites generally suggest that its rock were of  Turonian age.

Cnidarians

Gastropods
An unidentified naticid snail is known from the formation.

Porifera
A sponge spicule fragment is known from the formation.

Scaphopods

Vertebrate paleofauna

Cartilaginous Fish
Mako-like shark teeth are known from the formation.

Ray-finned fish
Other fish fossils include teeth, jaw fragments and scales.

Dinosaurs

In 1994, excavations for road material uncovered a hadrosaur specimen near the Glenn Highway, approximately 150 miles northeast of Anchorage. That Fall, excavation began on the specimen, now known as the "Talkeetna Mountains Hadrosaur" and concluded in the summer of 1996. The rocks containing the specimen were part of the formation's Member Four. The specimen is now housed at the University of Alaska Museum. It was formally described for the scientific literature by Pasch and May in 2001. The location of the specimen makes it significant as a biogeographic link between the hadrosaurs of North America and Asia. It was also the first associated skeleton of an individual dinosaur in Alaska.

Their examination of the specimen found the "Talkeetna Mountains Hadrosaur" to be a juvenile animal about 3 m (10 feet) long. It preserves the bones of the forelimbs, part of the front feet, ribs, and tail vertebrae. Other remains probably include the back vertebrae and pelvis. The researchers could not tell if the Talkeetna Mountains Hadrosaur was a hadrosaurid or lambeosaurid.

Pasch and May also attempted to reconstruct how the Talkeetna Mountains Hadrosaur came to be preserved in the fossil record. They determined that the specimen formed from the remains of a hadrosaur carcass that had bloated with gasses and been washed out to sea. Since none of the skull bones were present, the head must have fallen off before the carcass sank to the seafloor. The associated heteromorphic ammonites and inoceramid bivalves indicate that the Talkeetna Mountains Hadrosaur was buried at a depth greater than 35 m. The body came to rest on its left side with limbs outstretched. Pyrite was present in the rocks around the specimen, and may have formed from sulfur given off by the bacteria consuming the carcass.

About 20% of the hadrosaur's bones were enveloped by calcareous concretions but every single bone not found in a concretion bore many closely spaced ovular conical depressions. These ranged in diameter from 2.1 to 5.8 mm and from 1.6 to 3.6 mm deep. The damage to the body must have occurred after it drifted out to sea because if the damage had occurred beforehand, it likely would have punctured the body, preventing the buildup of bloating gases that allowed the carcass to drift out to sea in the first place. The depressions are the wrong shape to have been gastropod or sponge borings, so they are probably bite marks. However, none of the teeth belonging to the fishes preserved in the Matanuska Formation fit the size or arrangement of the bite marks. Pasch and May therefore ruled them out as candidates for the bite marks' origin.

Nevertheless, the size, spacing, and shape of the marks were similar to those of teeth from the mosasaur species Tylosaurus proriger. The distribution of bite marks corresponds inversely to the presence of flesh in the animal. For instance, lower limb bones sustained the most damage because there was the least amount of flesh shielding the bones at those locations. The largest parts of the animal would have been too large for the scavenging mosasaur to completely wrap its jaws around, and these are the areas around which the concretions formed. By contrast, the bones pulled free from the carcass were buried in the mud, which later lithified as mudstone.

Lizards
Nevertheless, the size, spacing, and shape of apparent bite marks on the bones of the Talkeetna Mountains Hadrosaur were similar to those of teeth from the mosasaur species Tylosaurus proriger, suggests that some similar animal swam in the waters of the Matanuska Formation's depositional environment.

Paleoflora

Palynomorphs
 Lycopodophyta: One Species
 Pteridophyta: Sixty-Nine Species
 Ginkgophyta: Nine Species
 Cycadophyta: Nine Species
 Pinophyta: Nine Species
 Anthophyta: Five Species

Trees
Fragments of petrified wood are known from the formation.

See also

 List of dinosaur-bearing rock formations

Footnotes

References
 
 
 Pasch, A. D., K. C. May. 2001. Taphonomy and paleoenvironment of hadrosaur (Dinosauria) from the Matanuska Formation (Turonian) in South-Central Alaska. In: Mesozoic Vertebrate Life. Ed.s Tanke, D. H., Carpenter, K., Skrepnick, M. W. Indiana University Press. Pages 219-2
 
 

Cretaceous Alaska